This is a list of Spanish television related events in 1977.

Events 
 28 October: Due to a Royal Decree, RTVE becomes an Autonomous Agence.
 19 November: Fernando Arias-Salgado is appointed Director General of RTVE.
 19 November: Last episode of Japanese anime 3000 Leagues in Search of Mother is aired on La 1. Tha main character finds his mother.

Debuts

Television shows

La 1

Ending this year

La 1 
 Los Libros (1974-1977) 
 La Guagua (1975-1977)
 Vivir para ver (1975-1977)
 Con otro acento (1976-1977)
 Paisaje con figuras (1976-1977) 
 Sábado cine (1976-1977) 
 La saga de los Rius (1976-1977)
 La Señora García se confiesa (1976-1977)

La 2 
 Original (1974-1977)

Foreign series debuts in Spain

Births

Deaths 
 27 March - Romano Villalba, director, 46.

See also
 1977 in Spain
 List of Spanish films of 1977

References 

1977 in Spanish television